BNR may refer to one of the following:

BNR Nieuwsradio, a Dutch radio station
Banca Naţională a României (Romanian for "National Bank of Romania")
Banque nationale du Rwanda (French for "National Bank of Rwanda")
Belarusian National Republic
Bell-Northern Research
Bengal Nagpur Railway (BNR), now renamed South Eastern Railway in Kolkata, India
Bergen Nordhordland Rutelag, a Norwegian transport corporation
Binary number representation, or two's complement, a format for representing signed numbers using binary notation
Biological nutrient removal, a process for treating wastewater
Blick nach Rechts, an information service about activities of the extreme right
"Body Not Recovered", an appellation to those killed in action or to those missing in action during a military operation, with the implication that the subject in question may be deceased
Breazeale Nuclear Reactor
Bulgarian National Radio
Burlington Northern Railroad
Backus–Naur form, a notation language in computer science